Gum Branch is a  long tributary to Nanticoke River in Sussex County, Delaware.  It is one of the major tributaries to the Nanticoke River in Delaware along with Deep Creek, Gravelly Branch, and Broad Creek.

See also
List of Delaware rivers

References

Rivers of Delaware
Rivers of Sussex County, Delaware
Tributaries of the Nanticoke River